Threat of force in public international law is a situation between states described by British lawyer Ian Brownlie as:
an express or implied promise by a government of a resort to force conditional on non-acceptance of certain demands of that government.

The 1969 Vienna Convention on the Law of Treaties notes in its preamble that both the threat and the use of force are prohibited. Moreover, in Article 52, it establishes the principle that if threats of using force are made during diplomatic negotiations, then any resulting treaty is invalid, stating "A treaty is void if its conclusion has been procured by the threat or use of force in violation of the principles of international law embodied in the Charter of the United Nations".

See also
Coercion

References

Further reading
Stürchler, Nikolas. (August 13, 2007). The Threat of Force in International Law. Series: Cambridge Studies in International and Comparative Law (No. 53). Cambridge University Press. .
World Court Digest web page referring to threat of force.

International law
International law legal terminology
Social philosophy